The  Green Bay Packers season was the franchise's 88th season overall and their 86th in the National Football League.

This season resulted in an 8–8 record. After the firing of Mike Sherman, the Packers hired Mike McCarthy as their head coach. 2006 would be McCarthy’s first year as head coach. The Packers improved from 4–12 the previous year to a .500 win average in 2006. The Packers failed to make the playoffs for the second straight year after the New York Giants gained the tie-breaker over the Packers in the last week of the 2006 NFL season.

Offseason
After some uncertainty, quarterback Brett Favre announced on April 26, 2006 that he would indeed return for the 2006 season. The Packers also acquired Oakland Raiders three-time Pro Bowl cornerbackCharles Woodson through free agency later that day. He officially signed with the team on May 9.

The Packers drafted Ohio State linebacker A. J. Hawk with the fifth overall pick in the 2006 NFL Draft on April 29, 2006. The Packers also traded star wide receiver (and potential holdout) Javon Walker to the Denver Broncos for a second round pick, which they then traded for multiple picks.

Undrafted free agents

The Packers picked up notable undrafted free agent Tramon Williams during the 2006 offseason, who later became the starting corner for the Super Bowl Champion 2010 Green Bay Packers. He was also selected but did not participate in the 2010 Pro Bowl.

Free agents

The Packers signed two notable free agents, CB Charles Woodson from the Oakland Raiders and DT Ryan Pickett from the St Louis Rams. Woodson would later be named the 2009 NFC Defensive Player of the Year and both players were integral parts of the 2010 Green Bay Packers  Super Bowl Championship team.

Personnel

Staff

Roster

Schedule

Standings

Regular season

Week 1: vs. Chicago Bears

Game summary 
The Packers opened the regular season on September 10 with a 26–0 loss to the Chicago Bears, the Packers' first scoreless game since October 17, 1991.

With the loss, the Packers began their season 0–1.

Scoring summary 

The day after the game the Packers acquired wide receiver Koren Robinson, who was released by the Minnesota Vikings after his second DUI in two years.

Week 2: vs. New Orleans Saints

Game summary 
The Packers hosted the New Orleans Saints on September 17, losing 34–27.  The Packers jumped out to a 13–0 lead after forcing 3 Saints turnovers, but were not able to hold the lead in the second half.  With the loss, the Packers fell to 0–2.

Scoring summary

Week 3 at Lions

The Packers posted their first win for the season while playing the Detroit Lions in Detroit, 31–24. Brett Favre completed his 400th career touchdown pass on a 75-yard play to rookie Greg Jennings, becoming only the second person (in addition to Dan Marino) to reach 400.  With the win the Packers improved to 1–2 while the Lions fell to 0–3. Favre was named NFC Offensive Player of the Week.

Week 4: at Philadelphia Eagles

Game summary 
The Packers went to Philadelphia to play the Eagles on Monday Night Football. The Packers started running back Vernand Morency as Ahman Green was inactive due to injury. The Packers held the lead at half time, but the Eagles scored 24 unanswered points in the second half to earn the victory.  As a result of Ahmad Carroll's performance in week 4, as well as previous weeks, the Packers released him from the team.  With the loss, the Packers fell to 1–3.

Scoring summary

Week 5: vs. St. Louis Rams

Game summary 
Noah Herron rushed for a career best 106 yards against the St. Louis Rams, but quarterback Marc Bulger of the Rams threw for two touchdowns to help his team to victory. The Packers had a chance to tie the score with a field goal or take the lead with a touchdown in their final possession, but were unable to do so as quarterback Brett Favre is sacked and fumbles at the St. Louis 18 yard line. The Rams were able to recover the ball.

With the loss, the Packers went into their bye week at 1–4.

Scoring summary

Week 7: at Miami Dolphins

Game summary 
Coming off their bye week, Green Bay defeated the Miami Dolphins on the road as the Packers defense intercepted quarterback Joey Harrington three times, with Charles Woodson returning one for a touchdown. Ahman Green carried the ball 18 times for 118 yards, including a 70-yard touchdown run. Brett Favre completed 19 of 35 passes, recording 206 yards and 2 touchdown passes.  This was the first victory for the Packers in Miami since winning Super Bowl II in 1968 as the team improved to 2–4.

Scoring summary

Week 8: vs. Arizona Cardinals

Game summary 
The Green Bay Packers won over the visiting Arizona Cardinals at home as running backs Ahman Green and Vernand Morency each rushed for over 100 yards, becoming the first Packers running back duo to accomplish that feat since the 1980s. Brett Favre threw for 180 yards and one touchdown, as well as one rushing touchdown.  Leading Green Bay's receiving corps was Donald Driver, who had five receptions for 58 Yards. Coming up behind him was David Martin, who had four receptions for 48 Yards and one touchdown.  On defense, the Packers limited Cardinals rookie quarterback Matt Leinart to 14/35 for 157 yards with one touchdown and one interception.  They also held Cardinals running back Edgerrin James to 84 rushing yards on 24 carries, along with three receptions for 25 receiving yards. Aaron Kampman was named NFC Defensive Player of the Week for his performance.

With the win, the Packers improved to 3–4.

Scoring summary

Week 9: at Buffalo Bills

Game summary 

The Green Bay Packers traveled on the road to face the Buffalo Bills. The Bills were able to lead the Packers at half time with a 10–0 lead, capitalizing on an interception return for a touchdown by London Fletcher. In the second half, the Packers tied the score with a touchdown pass to Donald Driver. The Bills were able to score in the fourth quarter with 43 yard touchdown pass to receiver Lee Evans. The Packers drove the ball deep to the one-yard line, but on first down the ball is intercepted and returned deep in Packer territory. The Bills were able to score three plays later to increase the lead by 14 and earn a victory.

With the loss, the Packers fell to 3–5.

Scoring summary

Week 10: at Minnesota Vikings

Game summary 
In week 10, Green Bay traveled to the Metrodome to face the Minnesota Vikings. The winner of the game would take second place in the NFC North. The Packers were able to score early in the first quarter with a field goal by Dave Rayner. Shortly after, Packer linebacker Brady Poppinga sacked Vikings quarterback Brad Johnson causing him to fumble; the Packers recovered the ball. The fumble set up a Brett Favre touchdown pass to Noah Herron. The Vikings were able to take the lead with two touchdowns, one a 40-yard touchdown pass to Billy McMullen. With under two minutes remaining in the half, the Packers regained the lead when Brett Favre threw an 82-yard touchdown pass to wide receiver Donald Driver. The Packers would hold the lead for the rest of the game.

With the win, the Packers improved to 4–5.

Brett Favre finished the game with 347 yards, two touchdowns, and no interceptions. Receiver Donald Driver had six catches for 191 yards. Vikings quarterback Brad Johnson threw for 257 yards, one touchdown, and one interception. Packer kicker Dave Rayner made three field goals in three attempts. A. J. Hawk was named NFL Rookie of the Week for his performance. He recorded 13 tackles, one forced fumble, and 1.5 sacks.

Scoring summary

Week 11: vs. New England Patriots

Game summary 
After a two-game road stretch, the Packers came back to Lambeau Field to face the New England Patriots. The Patriots handed Green Bay their second shutout of the season. Patriots quarterback Tom Brady threw for 244 yards and 4 touchdowns. In the second quarter, Green Bay quarterback Brett Favre was injured on a sack. He left the game and did not return. Backup quarterback Aaron Rodgers replaced Favre and completed only four out of twelve passes for 32 yards with one fumble. Rodgers suffered a broken foot in the loss and was placed on injured reserve, thus ending his season.  The Packers only recorded 120 total yards of offense and five total first downs. On the other side, the Patriots recorded 360 yards of total offense with 22 first downs.

With the loss, the Packers' record dropped to 4–6. The loss marked the first time the Packers were shut out at Lambeau Field twice in a season.

Scoring summary

Week 12: at Seattle Seahawks

Game summary 
In week 12, the Packers traveled to Qwest Field to play the Seattle Seahawks. It was the Packers' second Monday Night Football game of the season. Green Bay held the lead at the end of the first half, with a touchdown run from Ahman Green and a fumble return for a touchdown by Abdul Hodge, who recorded his first NFL start. Seattle kicker, Josh Brown kicked four field goals in the first half. In the second half, the Packers were able to increase the lead to nine points as quarterback Brett Favre threw a 48-yard touchdown pass to Donald Driver. Seattle would decrease the Packers lead to two points when quarterback Matt Hasselbeck threw a 23-yard touchdown pass to receiver D.J. Hackett. The Seahawks would take the lead in the fourth quarter with another touchdown pass from Matt Hasselbeck. Packers kicker Dave Rayner kicked a 34-yard field goal to decrease the Seahawks lead to three points, but on the next possession, Hasselbeck completed his third touchdown pass to Jerramy Stevens. The Packers were unable to score in the closing minutes of the game as Brett Favre is intercepted twice.

Seattle Seahawks running back, Shaun Alexander rushed 40 times for 201 yards, averaging about five yards per carry. Matt Hasselbeck completed 17 of 36 passes for 157 yards and three touchdowns. He was also intercepted three times, two of them by cornerback Charles Woodson. Brett Favre completed 22 passes in 36 attempts for 266 yards. He recorded a touchdown and three interceptions.

With the loss, the Packers fell to 4–7.

Scoring summary

Week 13: vs. New York Jets

Game summary 
The Packers traveled back home for a Week 13 inter-conference fight with the New York Jets.  In the first quarter, Green Bay trailed early as Jets kicker Mike Nugent kicked a 24-yard field goal, while quarterback Chad Pennington completed a 12-yard touchdown pass to receiver Jerricho Cotchery.  In the second quarter, the Jets were able to increase their lead even further with Jets running back Cedric Houston scoring from a 3-yard and a 1-yard TD run, while Pennington completed a 1-yard touchdown pass to tight end Chris Baker.  In the third quarter, the Packers scored their first points of the game when Dave Rayner kicked a 34-yard field goal. Later in the third quarter Brett Favre completed a 20-yard touchdown pass to wide receiver Donald Driver.  However, in the fourth quarter, the Jets wrapped up the game with running back Leon Washington's 20-yard touchdown run.  With their third-straight loss, Green Bay fell to 4–8.

Scoring summary

Week 14: at San Francisco 49ers

Game summary 
With three straight losses, the Packers traveled to Monster Park to play the San Francisco 49ers. The 49ers were the first team to score, with a field goal from kicker Joe Nedney. The Packers answered on their next possession as QB Brett Favre completed a 36-yard touchdown pass to rookie receiver Ruvell Martin, his first career touchdown. At the start of the second quarter, Packers kicker Dave Rayner increased the Packers lead to ten points with a 23-yard field goal. The Packers drove the football eighty yards on their next possession. The drive ended in a one-yard touchdown run by RB Ahman Green. Joe Nedney kicked a 36-yard field goal at the end of the first half. On the first drive of the second half, the 49ers completed a 79-yard drive with a one-yard touchdown run by running back Frank Gore. Later in the third quarter, Brett Favre completed a 68-yard touchdown pass to WR Donald Driver. In the fourth quarter, Dave Rayner kicked two field goals for the Packers. The 49ers scored their second touchdown of the day on a 52-yard touchdown pass to tight end Vernon Davis from quarterback Alex Smith.

Brett Favre completed 22 of 34 passes with 293 yards and two touchdowns. Nine of Favre's completions came to receiver Donald Driver, who recorded 160 yards receiving and one touchdown. 49ers quarterback Alex Smith completed 12 of 29 passes with 201 and one touchdown. He also threw two interceptions, one to safety Nick Collins and the other to rookie linebacker A. J. Hawk, his first career interception. 49ers running back Frank Gore recorded 130 yards rushing with one touchdown and 38 yards receiving. The win snapped the Packers three-game losing streak, moving them to 5–8. This win exceeded the Packers win total from last year when they recorded four wins.

Scoring summary

Week 15: vs. Detroit Lions

Game summary 
The Packers traveled back home to Lambeau Field to play the Detroit Lions. At the end of the first quarter, the game was tied after field goals by Dave Rayner and Jason Hanson. In the second quarter, the Packers took the lead with a fourteen-yard run by running back Vernand Morency. Before half time Brett Favre completed a 21-yard pass to Carlyle Holiday. This was Favre's 4,968th career completion, setting an NFL record previously held by Dan Marino. In the third quarter the Lions kicked their second field goal. In the fourth quarter, Brett Favre threw his third interception out of the Packers end zone which put the Lions at the twelve-yard line. The Lions were unable to score a touchdown and completed a field goal which put the Lions within one point of the Packers. On the next possession the Packers increased their lead to eight points when Vernand Morency ran 21 yards for his second touchdown of the day. On the Lions last possession of the game, the Packers sacked quarterback Jon Kitna twice to end the game.

Brett Favre, who set an NFL record for career completions finished the day with twenty completions out of 37 passes. He recorded 174 yards and three interceptions, two of which were in the red zone. The Packers defense limited the Lions to 142 yards, no touchdowns, and two of twelve completed third downs. The Lions leading rusher was quarterback Jon Kitna. The Packers sacked Kitna six times, a career-high of three from defensive tackle Cullen Jenkins, and two sacks from Aaron Kampman. Charles Woodson had a career-high sixth interception of the season.

With their 3rd-straight win over the Lions, the Packers improved to 6–8.

Scoring summary

Week 16 vs. Minnesota Vikings

Game summary 
The Packers played at Lambeau Field for the second time in five days, a Thursday night game versus their divisional rivals, the Minnesota Vikings. The game was played on the third anniversary of the passing of Irv Favre, Brett Favre's father. In the first quarter, the Packers entered the red zone on each of their drives, but only scored once on a 38-yard field goal from kicker Dave Rayner. Rayner would miss his next two field goals. The Packers defence forced the Vikings to punt on all their possessions in the first half. The Packers scored on the final play of the half with a 44-yard field goal from Dave Rayner. In the third quarter cornerback Charles Woodson intercepted Vikings quarterback Tarvaris Jackson, marking his seventh interception of the season extending a career-high. Later in the third quarter, Brett Favre was intercepted by cornerback Fred Smoot. Smoot returned the interception into the end zone, gaining the first lead of the game for the Vikings. In the fourth quarter the Packers drove the ball into Vikings territory, but tight end Bubba Franks fumbled the ball at the two-yard line, turning possession over to the Vikings. The Packers drove the ball 41 yards on their next possession to set Dave Rayner in position to attempt a field goal. Rayner made a 44-yard field goal with 1:34 left in the game to give the packers a 9–7 lead. The Vikings were unable to score on their last possession which granted the Packers their seventh win of the season.

Despite scoring only nine points, the Packers recorded 19 first downs and 319 total yards. Brett Favre completed 26 of 50 passes, gaining 285 yards. Favre also recorded two interceptions. Defensively, the Packers limited the Vikings to three total first downs and a 2–14 first down rate. The Vikings punted ten times in the game. Packers defensive end, Aaron Kampman had three sacks in the game.

The game marked only the third time in NFL history when the losing team scored the only touchdown off a defensive turnover, the first coming from another 9–7 result at Lambeau Field between the Packers and Vikings with the Vikings beating the Packers in that contest.

Scoring summary

Week 17 at Chicago Bears

Game summary 
On New Year's Eve, the Packers traveled to Chicago to face the Bears at Soldier Field. With the new NFL flexible-scheduling intact, the game was moved to the Sunday night because of playoff implications and the possibility of it being Brett Favre's last game. However, the Packers became ineligible for a playoff bid when the New York Giants clinched a tie-breaker earlier in the day. On the first drive of the game, the Packers drove the ball 75 yards, resulting in a 9-yard touchdown pass from Brett Favre to receiver Donald Driver. Later in the first quarter, Packers free safety Nick Collins intercepted quarterback Rex Grossman, returning the ball 55 yards for a touchdown. In the second quarter Rex Grossman threw his third interception of the game. Patrick Dendy returned the interception 33 yards for a touchdown. The Packers finished the half winning 23–0, with their defense forcing four turnovers.

Starting the second half, Brian Griese replaced Rex Grossman at quarterback. The Bears scored their first and only points of the game with a 75-yard touchdown pass to receiver Mark Bradley from Brian Griese in the third quarter. In the fourth quarter, the Packers increased their lead with a 46-yard field goal by Dave Rayner. The Bears had the ball only once in the fourth quarter. The drive ended in an interception by Nick Collins, recording his second of the game. Late in the game, Favre was replaced by quarterback Ingle Martin. Favre was carried off the field by Donald Driver, receiving many hugs by players and coaches. In an interview after the game, Favre broke down in tears. It was still at the time unclear whether Favre will retire or return to the Packers, but Favre announced in February that he would return to play with the Packers.

The Packers offense recorded 373 yards of offense. Brett Favre completed 21 of 42 passes with one touchdown and one interception. On defense, the Packers forced six turnovers. Five of the turnovers were interceptions. The Bears starting quarterback Rex Grossman recorded only a 0.0 quarterback rating in one half of play. With the win, the Packers moved to 8–8, improving on their record of 4–12 from the previous year.

Scoring summary

Seasonal statistical leaders
 Passing Yards: Brett Favre 3,885 Yards
 Passing Touchdowns: Brett Favre 18 TD
 QB Rating: Brett Favre, 72.7
 Rushing Yards: Ahman Green, 1,059 Yards
 Rushing Touchdowns: Ahman Green, 5 TD
 Receiving Yards: Donald Driver, 1,295 Yards
 Receiving Touchdowns: Donald Driver, 8 TD
 Points: Dave Rayner, 109 points
 Kickoff Return Yards: Vernand Morency, 670 Yards
 Punt Return Yards: Charles Woodson, 363 Yards
 Tackles: A. J. Hawk, 119 Tackles
 Sacks: Aaron Kampman, 15.5 Sacks
 Interceptions: Charles Woodson, 8 Interceptions

Awards and records

Hall of Famers
In 2006 Packer great Reggie White was inducted to the Pro Football Hall of Fame and was the lone inductee to the Green Bay Packers Hall of Fame

References

External links
 Pro-football-reference 2006 Packers season statistics 
 Packers.com results, stats, and analysis

Green Bay Packers
Green Bay Packers seasons
Green